WWF Forceable Entry is a soundtrack album by WWE (then known as the World Wrestling Federation, or WWF). Released on March 26, 2002 by Columbia Records, it features entrance music of WWE wrestlers re-recorded by various hard rock and heavy metal artists and bands. It is also the last album released under the "WWF" name, as the company changed its name to "WWE" in May 2002 after a British court ruled in favor of the World Wide Fund for Nature for ownership of the "WWF" initialism and branding (the World Wrestling Federation and the World Wide Fund for Nature had used the "WWF" name and branding since 1979 at the time). The album was a commercial success, charting at number three on the US Billboard 200.

Composition
Johnny Loftus of music website AllMusic categorized WWF Forceable Entry as alternative metal, post-grunge and rap metal. The album features a number of cover versions (including Kid Rock's cover of "Legs" by ZZ Top) and remixes (such as Limp Bizkit's "Rollin'" and Marilyn Manson's "The Beautiful People"), as well as new tracks. Some tracks are also new recordings of wrestlers' entrance themes, including Drowning Pool's cover of Motörhead's "The Game" (Triple H) and Disturbed's recording "Glass Shatters" (Stone Cold Steve Austin). Finger Eleven's song "Slow Chemical" (Kane) is a bonus track on some versions of the album as well.

Release
WWF Forceable Entry was released on March 26, 2002 by Columbia Records in association with SmackDown! Records, a division of WWE.

Reception

Commercial
WWF Forceable Entry was a commercial success. In the US, the album reached number three on the US Billboard 200; in Canada, it reached number three on the Canadian Albums Chart. It was certified gold by the Recording Industry Association of America, indicating sales of over 500,000 units. The album sold over 145,000 copies in the US in its first week on sale.

Critical
Music website AllMusic awarded the album two out of five stars. Writer Johnny Loftus noted that Forceable Entry "will be most relevant to wrestling fans," but joked that "fans of heavy music...might seek this set out in the local sale bin."

Track listing

Note: Track 19 only appears on the Canadian release of the album.

Personnel

Jim Johnston – executive production, remix (track 9), mixing (track 15)
Jay Baumgardner – production (track 1), mixing (tracks 1 and 10)
James Murray – engineering (track 1)
Kid Rock – production and mixing (track 2)
Al Sutton – engineering (track 2)
John Kurzweg – production, engineering and mixing (track 3)
Eric Thorngren – production, recording and mixing (track 4)
Terry Date – production and recording (track 5)
Limp Bizkit – production (track 5)
Josh Abraham – additional production (track 5)
Scott Weiland – additional production (track 5)
Andy Wallace – mixing (track 5)
Raine Maida – production (track 6)
Adam Kasper – mixing (track 6)
Rob Zombie – production (track 7)
Scott Humphrey – production and programming (track 7)
Frank Gryner – engineering (track 7)
The Old Dark Horse – mixing (track 7)
Matt Martone – production and engineering (track 8)
Justin Rimer – production (track 8)
Jack Joseph Puig – mixing (tracks 8 and 18)
Trent Reznor – production (track 9)
Dave Ogilvie – production (track 9)
Bryan Scott – production (track 10)
Jeremy Parker – engineering (track 10)
Ben Grosse – production and mixing (track 11)
Adam Barber – engineering (track 11)
Blumpy – engineering (track 11)
Bob Marlette – production, engineering, mixing and programming (track 12)
Sid Riggs – programming (track 12)
Dave Wyndorf – production (track 13)
John Shyloski – engineering (track 13)
John Travis – mixing (track 13)
Cyrille Taillandier – programming (track 13)
Stereomud – production (track 14)
Big Red – engineering and mixing (track 14)
Doug Kaye – production and engineering (track 15)
Rick Duncan – engineering (track 15)
Audio Hustlerz – production and arrangements (track 16)
Troy Staton – mixing (track 16)
Edsel Dope – production and engineering (track 17)
Warren Dyker – mixing (track 17)
Jim Wirt – production and engineering (track 18)
Matt Pinfield – liner notes

Charts

Weekly charts

Year-end charts

Certifications

See also

Music in professional wrestling

References

Forceable Entry
WWF Forceable Entry
WWF Forceable Entry
WWF Forceable Entry
WWF Forceable Entry